Richard James Frankenburg (June 3, 1929 – September 15, 2015) is a former Republican member of the Pennsylvania House of Representatives.

Background
Born in Pittsburgh, Pennsylvania on June 3, 1929, Frankenburg was a son of George and Ethel S. Frankenburg and the husband of Sue Anna (Ward) Frankenburg. A 1948 graduate of Wilkinsburg High School, he pursued studies with the Institute of Local Government at the University of Pittsburgh. From 1950 to 1960, he served with the United States Navy Reserves. Elected to the Wilkinsburg council in 1966, he served until 1970; he was then reelected to the council in 1977, and served until 1984.

A member of the Allegheny County Republican Committee from 1966 to 1972, he was also a member of the Young Republicans of Allegheny County. Elected to the Pennsylvania House of Representatives in 1970 and 1972, he was unsuccessful in reelection bids in 1974 and 1976.

Frankenburg died on September 15, 2015 in Wilkinsburg, Pennsylvania, and was interred at the Mount Royal Cemetery in the Allegheny County community of Glenshaw.

References

Republican Party members of the Pennsylvania House of Representatives
2015 deaths
1929 births
People from Wilkinsburg, Pennsylvania
Burials at Mount Royal Cemetery